The 2001–02 Sussex County Football League season was the 77th in the history of Sussex County Football League a football competition in England.

Division One

Division One featured 17 clubs which competed in the division last season, along with three new clubs, promoted from Division Two:
Hailsham Town
Peacehaven & Telscombe
Southwick

League table

Division Two

Division Two featured 13 clubs which competed in the division last season, along with five new clubs.
Clubs relegated from Division One:
East Preston
Eastbourne Town
Lancing
Clubs promoted from Division Three:
Rye United, who also changed name to Rye & Iden United
Seaford

League table

Division Three

Division Three featured twelve clubs which competed in the division last season, along with four new clubs:
Crowborough Athletic, relegated from Division Two
Lingfield, relegated from Division Two
Pease Pottage Village
Upper Beeding

League table

References

2001-02
2001–02 in English football leagues